Sauro Iozzelli (born 27 February 1957) is an Australian former soccer player who played as a goalkeeper. He played one match for Australia in 1978.

References

Living people
1957 births
Australian soccer players
Association football goalkeepers
Australia international soccer players